Argentine Bellegarde-Foureau (1842-1901) was a Haitian educator. 

She was the head of the national network of the girl schools of Haiti, the Pensionnat national des demoiselles, from 1880, and are regarded to have played an important part in the education of girls in Haiti. She was also known as a vocal critic of all abuse from both the liberal and national party, and spoke for solidarity and equal education for sexes as a principle to reform society.

References
 https://web.archive.org/web/20161030144150/http://www.haiticulture.ch/Argentine_Bellegarde-Foureau.html
 Dantès Bellegarde dans Femmes Haïtiennes, op.cit. p111 et suiv

1842 births
1901 deaths
19th-century Haitian educators
19th-century Haitian women